The Théâtre des Folies-Dramatiques was a theatre in Paris in the 19th and 20th centuries. Opened first in 1832 in the site of the old Théâtre de l'Ambigu-Comique on the Boulevard du Temple, under Frédérick Lemaître it became a noted venue for the genre of mélodrame.

In 1862, the theatre moved to the rue de Bondy and the repertoire developed more in the field of operetta, La fille de Madame Angot by Charles Lecocq in 1873, Les cloches de Corneville by Robert Planquette in 1877, Madame Favart, by Jacques Offenbach in 1878, La fille du tambour-major by Offenbach in 1879, La fauvette du temple by André Messager in 1885, La Béarnaise by Messager in 1887 and Surcouf by Robert Planquette in October of the same year being among the premieres seen at the theatre. Other operettas and light operas were revived along with many vaudevilles. The French version of Rip was given at the Folies-Dramatiques in 1884.

In the 1920s, the Théâtre des Folies-Dramatiques saw a succession of musical comedies: Le Mariage de Pyramidon (1923), Le Rosier (1924), Le Million du Bouif (1924), Micheline (1924), Le Tour du monde d'une midinette (1924), Ernest (1924), Maurin des Maures (1925) and Souris blonde (1926).

In the 1930s, the theatre turned into a cinema.

References 

Former theatres in Paris
11th arrondissement of Paris
Theatres completed in 1832
Theatres completed in 1862
1862 establishments in France